The Matheson History Museum Complex is located in  Gainesville, Florida. It includes the Matheson History Museum, the Matheson Library & Archives, the 1867 Matheson House, and the Tison Tool Barn.

Museum Complex

Matheson History Museum
The Matheson History Museum building, formerly an American Legion Hall and officially opened as a museum in 1994, houses the bulk of the museum complex's exhibitions and programs. The front of the building has a gift shop and a recreation of the Matheson Dry Goods Store that used to exist on Alachua Avenue (now University Avenue). The main gallery consists of a permanent display of local and Florida history along the east wall, with the remainder of the space devoted to rotating temporary exhibitions. The back of the building contains the Mary Ann Cofrin Exhibit Hall, where additional temporary exhibitions are on display.

1867 Matheson House
Originally owned and built by the Matheson family, from which the museum takes its name, this house was built in 1867 and is the third oldest house in Gainesville (the Bailey House was completed in 1854 and the Haile Homestead was completed in 1856). It was home to James Douglas Matheson and his wife, Augusta Florida Steele Matheson, daughter of Florida pioneer Augustus Steele (founder of Hillsborough County and Cedar Key). Their son, Christopher Matheson, was Gainesville's longest-serving mayor. Chris's widow, Sarah Hamilton Matheson, deeded to the museum first to the Alachua County Historical Society (of which she was a founding member) and later to the Matheson Historical Center (now the Matheson History Museum). Sarah Matheson, who died in 1996, was one of the original board members and founders of the museum and was also an early president of the Alachua County Historical Society, which originated in 1967 and later merged with the museum under the new name of Alachua County Historic Trust: Matheson Museum, Inc. In 2014, the museum changed its name to the Matheson History Museum. The Matheson House contains original furniture, artwork and artifacts from antebellum and Victorian era Florida.

Tison Tool Barn
Donated to the museum in 1993, the Tison Tool barn houses the extensive tool collection of John Mason Tison Jr. Originally located on Tison's property, it was entirely deconstructed and rebuilt on the museum grounds. It displays historic tools from various industries ranging from lumber to electrical engineering.

Sweetwater Park
Located directly behind the museum and maintained jointly by the Matheson History Museum and the City of Gainesville, Sweetwater Park is free and open to the public.

Matheson Library and Archives

Purchased by the museum in the summer of 2014, this building was originally a tabernacle church built in 1933. From 1976 to 1980 retired cardiologist and Matheson co-founder Dr. Mark Barrow and his wife, Mary, operated an antique store in the building. In 1982 they sold the building to  Orlando investors, and from 1982 to 2009 it was a  Melting Pot fondue restaurant. Originally operated by Hope Meucci, it was one of the first Melting Pot fondue restaurants in the nation. The Matheson History Museum received a $300,000 historic preservation grant from the Florida Department of State, Division of Historical Resources, along with contributions from private donors, to transform the building into a library and archives for the museum's local history collections. The Matheson Library & Archives was completed in 2017. It houses the Matheson History Museum's collections, including local and Florida artifacts, books and vertical files with images and information on a variety of topics in local and Florida history.

See also
List of museums in Florida

References

External links

Matheson History Museum website

Museums in Gainesville, Florida
Historical society museums in Florida
1994 establishments in Florida
Museums established in 1994